Yangzhou Asiastar Bus Co., Ltd  is a bus manufacturer based in Yangzhou, Jiangsu, China.  Founded in 1998, it is a subsidiary of Jiangsu Yaxing. The company's brands include Yaxing, Yangtse, Eurise and AsiaStar. Yaxing buses are largely sold domestically in China, but also have a presence in a number of international markets. It is listed on the Shanghai Stock Exchange.

History
Yangzhou Yaxing Motor Coach Co., Ltd., aka Asiastar, traces its origins to May 1949, when the Shanghai Military Control Commission assumed control of the former sapper squadron of the Kuomintang, renaming it the Automobile Maintenance Firm of Logistics Department of East China Air Force of the Chinese People's Liberation Army. This was moved to Yangzhou in April 1958, where it was merged with the Yangzhou Automobile Maintenance Factory as the Yangzhou Automobile Maintenance and Manufacture Factory, which began producing automobiles (branded Yunhe) and tractors (branded Gongnong) alongside farm equipment. After gaining experience, the factory began producing the JS130/JS140 heavy-duty trucks and JS340 dump trucks in the late 1960s, then began producing the JT661A bus chassis in 1979.

The factory was renamed to the Jiangsu Yangzhou Automobile Maintenance and Manufacture Factory in 1981 and the first JT663 coach was built and delivered to the Eighth Team of Jiangsu Passenger Transportation Co., Ltd. in February 1981. The JT663 was the first dedicated bus chassis built and the factory was renamed again to the Jiangsu Yangzhou Coach Manufacture Factory in 1985. The company continued to develop buses, launching the JS6879 coach in 1989 in cooperation with the Xi'an Highway Institute, as the first domestic sleeper coach. The factory was renamed again to the Jiangsu Yangzhou Coach Manufacture Main Factory in 1990.

The JS6971 luxury inter-city tourism coach was launched in 1993, which marked the first use of a domestically-produced rear axle. The Jiangsu Asiastar Bus (Group) Co., Ltd. was founded in August 1996, followed by the  Yangzhou Asiastar Motor Coach Co., Ltd. ( in September 1998, with the approval of the provincial government; Yangzhou Asiastar was then listed on the Shanghai Stock Exchange in August 1999.

Asiastar started several joint ventures with western companies, including Mercedes-Benz, to further develop domestic manufacturing and quality controls. In 2009, Weichai Group entered into a strategic framework cooperation agreement with Yangzhou Asiastar and the People's Republic of China and laid the cornerstone for a new Yangzhou factory in 2011. In 2012, Yangzhou Asiastar formed a holding company named Fengtai Bus and Coach International (FTBCI). The company's second factory is located in the Xiamen Free Trade Zone, which specializes in electric buses.

Models

Transit Buses

JS6106GH
JS6110SH
JS6111SHA
JS6126GHA
JS6127GHA
JS6130SH
JS6761GHA
JS6770GHA
JS6811GH
JS6906GHA
JS6906GHC
JS6936GH

Coaches
JS6882TA
JS6990TA
YBL6101H
YBL6105HE32
YBL6118H1E31
YBL6119HJ
YBL6121H
YBL6123H
YBL6123H1E31
YBL6125H
YBL6128H
YBL6128SD
YBL6796HE3
YBL6805H
YBL6856HE3
YBL6905H1CJ

Special Buses
YBL5130XQCHE31 Police Bus

Mini Buses
JS6550T
JS6600T
JS6608TA
JS6608TB
JS6739TA
JS6752T
JS6830GHDP (exclusive to Canadian and US markets)
YZL6701TA

School Buses
JS6600XC
JS6660XC
JS6730XC
JS6790XC

Vans
Eurise

See also
Chinese Wikipedia page

References

External links
Yaxing Coach webpage

Bus manufacturers of China
Companies based in Jiangsu
Companies established in 1998
Chinese brands
Vehicle manufacturing companies established in 1998